Chandina Government Model High School (চান্দিনা সরকারি মডেল পাইলট উচ্চ বিদ্যালয়) is a boys and girls high school in Chandina, Comilla District, Bangladesh. It was established in 1916 and its present headmaster is Emdadul Haque. 

The school has three academic buildings and an administrative building. There is a big field at the school. Other facilities include a mosque, workshop, canteen, shaheed minar, and library. The school has laboratories and a computer lab. Chandina Pilot Model High School has produced a lot of scientists, engineers, writers, musicians, artists, doctors, journalists, lawyers, filmmakers, professional athletes, politicians, university teachers, government officials, and successful businessmen.

Notable alumni
 Pran Gopal Datta (Professor & Vice Chancellor, Dept. of ENT, Bangabandhu Sheikh Mujib Medical University

References

High schools in Bangladesh
Educational institutions established in 1916
1916 establishments in India
Schools in Comilla District